Kitty is a 2009 Russian psychedelic comedy film directed by Grigory Konstantinopolsky.

Plot 
The film tells about five different people: a baby, a teenager, a successful businessman, a loser writer and an elderly ballerina, each of whom believes that he will achieve success and personal happiness.

Cast 
 Pavel Derevyanko as The visitor on wedding (credit only)
 Mikhail Efremov as Ballerina Varechka (credit only)
 Svetlana Ivanova as Nastya (credit only)
 Yuri Kolokolnikov as The visitor on wedding (as Yuriy Kolokolnikov) (credit only)
 Grigoriy Konstantinopolskiy
 Aleksandr Strizhenov as Businessman Viktor (credit only)
 Yevgeny Stychkin as Writer Pavlik (credit only)
 Viktor Sukhorukov as Serezha (credit only)

References

External links 
 

2009 films
2000s Russian-language films
Russian comedy films